A discography of Corpus Hermeticum (record label).

HERMES 001 A Handful of Dust Concord LP
HERMES 002 A Handful of Dust The Philosophick Mercury CD +
HERMES 003 A Handful of Dust The Eighthness Of Adam Qadmon cassette
HERMES 004 A Handful of Dust The Seventhness lathe cut 7-inch
HERMES 005 A Handful of Dust Musica Humana CD +
HERMES 006 A Handful of Dust Three Dances In Honour Of Sabbatai Sevi, The Apostate Messiah lathe cut 7-inch EP
HERMES 007 Kim Pieters / Bruce Russell / Peter Stapleton Last Glass CD
HERMES 008 Michael Morley "Radiation" / Bruce Russell "Four Letters" lathe cut 7-inch
HERMES 009 A Handful of Dust From A Soundtrack To The Anabase Of St. John Pierce cassette
HERMES 010 A Handful of Dust Authority Over All Signs Of The Earth lathe cut 7-inch
HERMES 011 Thurston Moore with Tom Surgal Klangfarbenmelodie..And The Colorist Strikes Primitiv CD
HERMES 012 Doramaar Copula CD
HERMES 013 A Handful of Dust Now Gods, Stand Up for Bastards CD +
HERMES 014 Various Le Jazz Non CD
HERMES 015 The Dead C  "Metalheart" lathe cut 7-inch
HERMES 016 Dust / Omit Deformed CD
HERMES 017 Flying Saucer Attack F.S.A. CD (also HERMES 018)
HERMES 019 The Shadow Ring Wax-Work Echoes CD
HERMES 020 A Handful of Dust Topology Of A Phantom City cassette
HERMES 021 Surface Of The Earth Surface Of The Earth CD
HERMES 022 Alan Licht The Evan Dando Of Noise CD +
HERMES 023 K-Group K-Group CD
HERMES 024 Omit Quad triple CD (also HERMES 025 & 026)
HERMES 027 Sandoz Lab Technicians Let Me Lose My Mind Gracefully CD
HERMES 028 Kjetil D. Brandsdal Freedom - Waaoh Waaaoh CD
HERMES 029 A Handful of Dust Urban Psychogeography, Vol II: Jerusalem, Street of Graves CD
HERMES 030 Omit Interior Desolation CD
HERMES 031 Matt De Gennaro & Alastair Galbraith Wire Music CD
HERMES 032 RST Warm Planes CD
HERMES 033 Lovely Midget Lovely Midget CD
HERMES 034  / Jérôme Noetinger / Mathieu Werchowski L.Marchetti/J.Noetinger/M.Werchowski CD
HERMES 035 Bruce Russell Painting the Passports Brown CD
HERMES 036 Tetuzi Akiyama / Taku Sugimoto / Bo Wiget Hokou CD
HERMES 037 Birchville Cat Motel We Count These Prayers CD
HERMES 038 Pascal Battus / Eric Cordier / Jean Luc Guionnet Pheromon: Disparture CD
HERMES 039 Greg Malcolm Homesick for Nowhere CD
HERMES 040 Tetuzi Akiyama / Toshimaru Nakamura / Bruce Russell International Domestic CD
HERMES 041 Ralf Wehowsky / Bruce Russell Sights CD

+ these items are packaged with Logopandocy: The Journal of Vain Erudition

Logopandocy: The Journal of Vain Erudition

Logopandocy is an occasional journal, published by the Ekskubalauron Press and edited by Bruce Russell. Issues were distributed with Corpus Hermeticum releases. Vol. 1 No.4 included Logopandocy's first letter to the editor, written by Alan Licht.  Most of the Logopandocy texts, along with related material, were compiled in Bruce Russell's book Left-handed blows: writing on sound, 1993–2009 published by Clouds in 2010.

See also
 Corpus Hermeticum (record label)
 Xpressway record label, also founded by Bruce Russell
 Discogs entry on Corpus Hermeticum

References

Record label discographies
New Zealand record labels
Alternative rock record labels
Dunedin Sound